Khanh Hoa Football Club is a professional football club based in Khánh Hòa Province, Vietnam. They compete in V.League 1, the highest division football tournament in Vietnam.
The team is currently playing at Nha Trang Stadium.

Current squad
As of 17 January 2023

Honours

National competitions
League
V.League 2:
 Runners-up : 2014, 2022
 Third place : 2020
Second League
 Winners : 2013

Other competitions
Mekong Club Championship:
 Runners-up : 2017 
Festival Hoa Da Lat Cup:
 Champions : 2022

Kit suppliers and shirt sponsors

Regional record

Season by season domestic record

Head coach history
Head coaches by Years (2013–present)

Logo

See also
Sanna Khanh Hoa Futsal Club

References

External links
 Club in Soccerway

Association football clubs established in 2013
Football clubs in Vietnam
2013 establishments in Vietnam